is a town located in Tamana District, Kumamoto Prefecture, Japan.

The town was formed on March 1, 2006 from the merger of the towns of Kikusui and Mikawa, both from Tamana District.

As of October 2016, the town has an approximate population of 10,030 and a density of about 100 persons per km². The total area is 98.75 km².

References

External links

Nagomi official website 

Towns in Kumamoto Prefecture